Lacroix is a crater that is located in the southwest part of the Moon, to the northwest of the large walled plain Schickard. The most notable feature of this crater is the smaller crater Lacroix J that overlies the southern  rim. The surviving rim of Lacroix is nearly circular, with a slightly worn inner wall. The interior floor is relatively featureless.

Satellite craters
By convention these features are identified on lunar maps by placing the letter on the side of the crater midpoint that is closest to Lacroix.

External links
 LAC-110, lunar chart from Gazetteer of Planetary Nomenclature

References

 
 
 
 
 
 
 
 
 
 
 
 

Impact craters on the Moon